James Milner, 9th Seigneur of Sark (died 1730) bought the fief of Sark from John Johnson in 1723 for £5,000, and was Seigneur of Sark until 1730.  His heir and son-in-law, Joseph Wilcocks, the incumbent Bishop of Gloucester, sold the fief to Susanne le Pelley without ever claiming the title of Seigneur.

References 

1730 deaths
Seigneurs of Sark
Year of birth unknown